The iPhone is a line of smartphones produced by Apple Inc. which uses Apple's own iOS mobile operating system. The first-generation iPhone was announced by then-Apple CEO Steve Jobs on January 9, 2007. Since then, Apple has annually released new iPhone models and iOS updates. As of November 1, 2018, more than 2.2 billion iPhones had been sold. As of 2022, the iPhone accounts for 15.6% of global smartphone market share.

The iPhone was the first mobile phone with multi-touch technology. Since the iPhone's launch, it gained larger screen sizes, video-recording, waterproofing, and many accessibility features. Up to iPhone 8 and 8 Plus, iPhones had a single button on the front panel with the Touch ID fingerprint sensor. Since iPhone X, iPhone models have switched to a nearly bezel-less front screen design with Face ID facial recognition, and app switching activated by gestures. Touch ID is still used for the budget iPhone SE series.

The iPhone is one of the two largest smartphone platforms in the world alongside Android, and is a large part of the luxury market. The iPhone has generated large profits for Apple, making it one of the world's most valuable publicly traded companies. The first-generation iPhone was described as a "revolution" for the mobile phone industry and subsequent models have also garnered praise. The iPhone has been credited with popularizing the smartphone and slate form factor, and with creating a large market for smartphone apps, or "app economy". , Apple's App Store contained more than 2.2 million applications for the iPhone.

History 

Development of an Apple smartphone began in 2004, when Apple started to gather a team of 1,000 employees led by hardware engineer Tony Fadell, software engineer Scott Forstall, and design officer Jony Ive, to work on the highly confidential "Project Purple".

Then-Apple CEO Steve Jobs steered the original focus away from a tablet (which was later revisited in the form of the iPad) towards a phone. Apple created the device during a secretive collaboration with Cingular Wireless (later renamed AT&T Mobility) at the time—at an estimated development cost of US$150 million over thirty months. According to Jobs in 1998, the "i" word in "iMac" (and therefore "iPod", "iPhone" and "iPad") stands for internet, individual, instruct, inform, and inspire.

Apple rejected the "design by committee" approach that had yielded the Motorola ROKR E1, a largely unsuccessful "iTunes phone" made in collaboration with Motorola. Among other deficiencies, the ROKR E1's firmware limited storage to only 100 iTunes songs to avoid competing with Apple's iPod nano. Cingular gave Apple the liberty to develop the iPhone's hardware and software in-house, a rare practice at the time, and paid Apple a fraction of its monthly service revenue (until the iPhone 3G), in exchange for four years of exclusive U.S. sales, until 2011.

Jobs unveiled the first-generation iPhone to the public on January 9, 2007, at the Macworld 2007 convention at the Moscone Center in San Francisco. The iPhone incorporated a 3.5-inch multi-touch display with few hardware buttons, and ran the iPhone OS operating system with a touch-friendly interface, then marketed as a version of Mac OS X. It launched on June 29, 2007, at a starting price of US$499 in the United States, and required a two-year contract with AT&T.

On July 11, 2008, at Apple's Worldwide Developers Conference (WWDC) 2008, Apple announced the iPhone 3G, and expanded its launch-day availability to twenty-two countries, and it was eventually released in 70 countries and territories. The iPhone 3G introduced faster 3G connectivity, and a lower starting price of US$199 (with a two-year AT&T contract). Its successor, the iPhone 3GS, was announced on June 8, 2009, at WWDC 2009, and introduced video recording functionality.

The iPhone 4 was announced on June 7, 2010, at WWDC 2010, and introduced a redesigned body incorporating a stainless steel frame and a rear glass panel. At release, the iPhone 4 was marketed as the "world's thinnest smartphone"; it uses the Apple A4 processor, being the first iPhone to use an Apple custom-designed chip. It introduced the Retina display, having four-times the display resolution of preceding iPhones, and was the highest-resolution smartphone screen at release; a front-facing camera was also introduced, enabling video calling functionality via FaceTime.

Users of the iPhone 4 reported dropped/disconnected telephone calls when holding their phones in a certain way, and this issue was nicknamed "antennagate". In January 2011, as Apple's exclusivity agreement with AT&T was expiring, Verizon announced that they would be carrying the iPhone 4, with a model compatible with Verizon's CDMA network releasing on February 10.

The iPhone 4S was announced on October 4, 2011, and introduced the Siri virtual assistant, a dual-core A5 processor, and an 8 megapixel camera with 1080p video recording functionality. The iPhone 5 was announced on September 12, 2012, and introduced a larger 4-inch screen, up from the 3.5-inch screen of all previous iPhone models, as well as faster 4G LTE connectivity. It also introduced a thinner and lighter body made of aluminum alloy, and the 30-pin dock connector of previous iPhones was replaced with the new, reversible Lightning connector.

The iPhone 5S and iPhone 5C were announced on September 10, 2013. The iPhone 5S included a 64-bit A7 processor, becoming the first ever 64-bit smartphone; it also introduced the Touch ID fingerprint authentication sensor. The iPhone 5C was a lower-cost device that incorporated hardware from the iPhone 5, into a series of colorful plastic frames.

On September 9, 2014, Apple introduced the iPhone 6 and iPhone 6 Plus, and included significantly larger screens than the iPhone 5S, at 4.7-inch and 5.5-inch respectively; both models also introduced mobile payment technology via Apple Pay. Optical image stabilization was introduced to the 6 Plus' camera. The Apple Watch was also introduced on the same day, and is a smartwatch that operates in conjunction with a connected iPhone. Some users experienced bending issues from normal use with the iPhone 6 and 6 Plus, particularly on the latter model, and this issue was nicknamed "bendgate".

The iPhone 6S and 6S Plus were introduced on September 9, 2015, and included a more bend-resistant frame made of a stronger aluminum alloy, as well as a higher resolution 12-megapixel main camera capable of 4K video recording. The first-generation iPhone SE was introduced on March 21, 2016, and was a low-cost device that incorporated newer hardware from the iPhone 6S, in the frame of the older iPhone 5S.

The iPhone 7 and 7 Plus were announced on September 7, 2016, which introduced larger camera sensors, IP67-certified water and dust resistance, and a quad-core A10 Fusion processor utilizing big.LITTLE technology; the 3.5mm headphone jack was removed, and was followed by the introduction of the AirPods wireless earbuds. Optical image stabilization was added to the 7's camera. A second telephoto camera lens was added on the 7 Plus, enabling two-times optical zoom, and "Portrait" photography mode which simulates bokeh in photos.

The iPhone 8, 8 Plus, and iPhone X were announced on September 12, 2017, in Apple's first event held at the Steve Jobs Theater in Apple Park. All models featured rear glass panel designs akin to the iPhone 4, wireless charging, and a hexa-core A11 Bionic chip with "Neural Engine" AI accelerator hardware. The iPhone X additionally introduced a 5.8-inch OLED "Super Retina" display with a "bezel-less" design, with a higher pixel density and contrast ratio than previous iPhones with LCD displays, and introduced a stronger frame made of stainless steel. It also introduced Face ID facial recognition authentication hardware, in a "notch" screen cutout, in place of Touch ID; the home button was removed to make room for additional screen space, replacing it with a gesture-based navigation system. At its US$999 starting price, the iPhone X was the most expensive iPhone at launch.

The iPhone XR, iPhone XS, and XS Max were announced on September 12, 2018. All models featured the "Smart HDR" computational photography system, and a significantly more powerful "Neural Engine". The XS Max introduced a larger 6.5-inch screen. The iPhone XR included a 6.1-inch LCD "Liquid Retina" display, with a "bezel-less" design similar to the iPhone X, but does not include a second telephoto lens; it was made available in a series of vibrant colors, akin to the iPhone 5C, and was a lower-cost device compared to the iPhone X and XS.

The iPhone 11, 11 Pro, and 11 Pro Max were announced on September 10, 2019. The iPhone 11 was the successor to the iPhone XR, while the iPhone 11 Pro and 11 Pro Max succeeded the iPhone XS and XS Max. All models gained an ultra-wide lens, enabling two-times optical zoom out, as well as larger batteries for longer battery life. The second-generation iPhone SE was introduced on April 17, 2020, and was a low-cost device that incorporated newer hardware from the iPhone 11, in the frame of the older iPhone 8, while retaining the home button and the Touch ID sensor.

The iPhone 12, 12 Mini, 12 Pro, and 12 Pro Max were announced via a livestream event on October 13, 2020. All models featured OLED "Super Retina XDR" displays, introduced faster 5G connectivity, and the MagSafe magnetic charging and accessory system; a slimmer flat-edged design was also introduced, which combined with stronger glass-ceramic front glass, added better drop protection compared to previous iPhones. The iPhone 12 Mini introduced a smaller 5.4-inch screen, while the 12 Pro and 12 Pro Max had larger screens of 6.1-inch and 6.7-inch respectively. The iPhone 12 Pro and 12 Pro Max additionally added a Lidar sensor for better accuracy in augumented reality (AR) applications.

The iPhone 13, 13 Mini, 13 Pro, and 13 Pro Max were announced via a livestream event on September 14, 2021. All models featured larger camera sensors, larger batteries for longer battery life, and a narrower "notch" screen cutout. The iPhone 13 Pro and 13 Pro Max additionally introduced smoother adaptive 120 Hz refresh rate "ProMotion" technology in its OLED display, and three-times optical zoom in the telephoto lens. The low-cost third-generation iPhone SE was introduced on March 8, 2022, and incorporated the A15 Bionic chip from the iPhone 13, but otherwise retained similar hardware to the second-generation iPhone SE.

The iPhone 14, 14 Plus, 14 Pro, and 14 Pro Max were announced on September 7, 2022. All models introduced satellite phone emergency calling functionality. The iPhone 14 Plus introduced the large 6.7-inch screen size, first seen on the iPhone 12 Pro Max, into a lower-cost device. The iPhone 14 Pro and 14 Pro Max additionally introduced a higher-resolution 48-megapixel main camera, the first increase in megapixel count since the iPhone 6S; it also introduced always-on display technology to the lock screen, and an interactive status bar interface integrated in a redesigned screen cutout, entitled "Dynamic Island".

Production 
Up to the iPhone 4, all iPhones and other iOS devices were manufactured by Foxconn, based in Taiwan. In 2011, new CEO Tim Cook changed Apple's manufacturing strategy to diversify its suppliers. The iPhone 4S in 2012 was the first model to be manufactured simultaneously by two stand-alone companies: Foxconn and Pegatron, the latter also based in Taiwan. Although Foxconn still produces more iPhones, Pegatron's orders have been slowly increased: the company made part of the iPhone 5C line in 2013, and 30% of iPhone 6 devices in 2014. The 6 Plus model was produced solely by Foxconn. In 2019, Apple investigated reports that some Foxconn managers had used rejected parts to build iPhones. In India, Apple pays Wistron, a Taiwan-based manufacturer with a plant near Bangalore, to assemble iPhones to sell in the region.

In 2022, Apple announced that a portion of iPhone 14 would be manufactured in Tamil Nadu, India, as a response to China's "zero-COVID" policy that has negatively affected global supply chains for many industries. Apple has stated that they plan to shift 25% of iPhone production to India by 2025.

Models 

38 iPhone models have been produced. The models in bold are devices of the latest generation:

Hardware 

Apple directly sub-contracts hardware production to external OEM companies, maintaining a high degree of control over the end product. The iPhone contains most of the hardware parts of a typical modern smartphone. Some hardware elements, such as 3D Touch and the Taptic Engine, are unique to the iPhone. The main hardware of the iPhone is the touchscreen, with current models offering screens of 4.7 inches and larger. All iPhones include a rear-facing camera; the front-facing camera dates back to the iPhone 4. The iPhone 7 Plus introduced multiple lenses to the rear-facing camera. A range of sensors are also included on the device, such as a proximity sensor, ambient light sensor, accelerometer, gyroscopic sensor, magnetometer, facial recognition sensor or fingerprint sensor (depending on the model) and barometer. In 2022, Apple added satellite communications to the iPhone, with the release of the iPhone 14 and iPhone 14 Pro.

Software

Operating system 

The iPhone runs iOS. It is based on macOS's Darwin and many of its userland APIs, with Cocoa replaced by Cocoa Touch, and AppKit replaced by UIKit. The graphics stack runs on Metal, Apple's low-level graphics API. The iPhone comes with a set of bundled applications developed by Apple, and supports downloading third-party applications through the App Store.

Apple provides free updates to iOS over-the-air, or through Finder and iTunes on a computer. Major iOS releases have historically accompanied new iPhone models.

App Store and third-party apps 

At WWDC 2007 on June 11, 2007, Apple announced that the iPhone would support third-party Ajax web applications that share the look and feel of the iPhone interface. On October 17, 2007, Steve Jobs, in an open letter posted to Apple's "Hot News" weblog, announced that a software development kit (SDK) would be made available to third-party developers in February 2008. The iPhone SDK was officially announced and released on March 6, 2008. The App Store was launched with the release of iPhone OS 2.0, on July 11, 2008.

Apple requires all third-party apps to be downloaded from the App Store, with exceptions for ad-hoc apps used within enterprises. Developers must pay a yearly $99 fee as part of Apple's Developer Program; if their membership expires, their apps are removed from the App Store, though existing users retain the ability to redownload the app. Developers can release free apps, or paid apps for which Apple takes a 30% cut of proceeds. Developers earning less than $1 million in annual sales qualify for the App Store Small Business Program, with Apple only taking a 15% fee.

Though iOS has far lower market share than Android, its app ecosystem has been described as superior, with higher-quality apps, and more iOS-exclusive releases. Android's version fragmentation, less uniform hardware, and lower app revenues have been cited as key factors.

All apps must pass Apple's app review process before being distributed in the App Store. Apple may also stop distributing apps it deems inappropriate. For example, in 2009, Apple rejected the Newspapers app due to The Sun's "obscene" topless Page 3 girls.  In 2018, Apple removed Tumblr from the App Store, citing illegal content, causing Tumblr to ban all adult content from their platform. The App Store's review process has been criticized by developers as "frustrating", "anti-competitive", and "asinine".

Users can also install native apps outside of the App Store through jailbreaking. Jailbreaking may cause security issues, and is not supported by Apple.

, Apple has passed 60 billion app downloads. , there have been over 140 billion app downloads from the App Store. , the App Store has over 2.2million apps for the iPhone.

Jailbreaking 

Apple restricts the installation of unapproved third-party apps and does not allow full access to the iPhone's filesystem. According to Jonathan Zittrain, the emergence of closed devices like the iPhone has made computing more proprietary than it was in the PC era. Jailbreaking allows users to install apps not available on the App Store, customize their device in ways not allowed by Apple, and bypass SIM locks without carrier approval. Some jailbreak tweaks were later copied by Apple and implemented into iOS, like multitasking, widgets, and copy and paste.

Apple attempted to use the DMCA to fight jailbreaking; however in 2010, the U.S. found jailbreaking to be legal. Jailbroken iPhones are at higher risk of malware. In the United States, Apple cannot void an iPhone's warranty solely due to jailbreaking. Jailbreaks rely on exploits. Apple has improved the iPhone's hardware and software security, making these exploits harder to find; as a result, recent iPhones cannot currently be jailbroken.

Accessibility 
The iPhone contains a range of accessibility features to support users' visual, auditory, and motor needs. iPhones can notify users through onscreen banners, audio alerts, vibrations, or the LED flash; vibration patterns can be customized by users. Since iOS 15, Siri can read notifications out loud through earphones, and, since iOS 16, through the device's speakers.

Users with motor needs can use Assistive Touch to customize the way they navigate through menus; it can assist users who have difficulties with some gestures, like pinching, and makes these gestures available by tapping on a menu. The user can create their own gestures and customize the layout of the AssistiveTouch menu. If the user has trouble pressing the Home button, it can be set so that it can be activated with an onscreen tap. Gestures, like rotate and shake, are available even when if the iOS device is mounted on a wheelchair. Head Tracking can be used to control an iPhone using facial movements recognized by the front camera.

Low-vision users can enable VoiceOver, a screen reader which describes what is on the screen, while Siri allows for hands-free interaction. The iPhone also supports wireless braille displays to help users read its interface. Text can be enlarged system-wide. The Magnifier app uses the iPhone's Lidar scanner to identify objects, for example doors, people, and objects, and can describe them to the user, as well as their distance. Door Detection can alert the user through sound, speech, and haptics.

Hearing aids that are part of the Made for iPhone program can be controlled from an iPhone. These hearing aids also feature Live Listen, which enables the iPhone to act as a directional microphone, beaming its audio to compatible hearing aids. Live Listen can help the user hear a conversation in a noisy room or hear someone speaking across the room. Apple built Live Listen support into all AirPods, which can also relay audio from a connected iPhone's microphone. Closed captioning and external TTY devices are supported, while Live Caption can transcribe audio across all apps and display it onscreen.  Sound Recognition can recognize surrounding noises, including door bells, kettles, water running, and babies crying, and notify the user with an onscreen alert.

Guided Access helps people with autism, ADHD, or sensory challenges stay focused on a single app. With Guided Access, a parent, teacher, or therapist can limit an iOS device to stay on one app by disabling the Home button and limit the amount of time spent in an app. The user can restrict access to the keyboard or touch input on certain areas of the screen.

Marketing 
The original iPhone was heavily promoted before its official announcement, creating buzz and anticipation. Upon its release, it was marketed heavily in television, web and print ads created in partnership with TBWA\Chiat\Day.

Apple's premium market positioning has led the iPhone to be seen as a status symbol.

The Apple ecosystem has been described as a key moat that increases iPhone brand loyalty. iMessage has especially been singled out, with its "green bubbles" phenomena. In iMessage, SMS messages from Android users appear as green bubble, rather than the blue bubbles used for texts from other iPhone users. Group chats between iOS and Android are poorly supported; reactions display as text, rather than bubbles, and images are sent through MMS, which degrades image quality. Some teens have described being "ostracized" after switching to Android, which Google has labelled "bullying." This has been described by critics as a key factor leading 87% of U.S. teenagers to use iPhones.

Retail

SIM unlocking 

Many iPhones bought through a monthly carrier contract are SIM locked, restricting their use to one particular carrier. While the iPhone was initially sold in the U.S. only on the AT&T network with a SIM lock in place, various hackers found methods to bypass that SIM lock. More than a quarter of first-generation iPhones sold in the U.S. were not registered with AT&T. Apple speculated that they were likely shipped overseas and unlocked, a lucrative market before the iPhone 3G's worldwide release.  Today, many carriers either remove the SIM lock automatically after a certain period, or do it upon request, either for free or for a small fee. iPhones bought from Apple are not SIM locked. Many carriers also sell the iPhone unlocked when purchased outright rather than on a long-term contract.

Retail strategy 
Since 2013, iPhone buyers can obtain a trade-in discount when buying a new iPhone directly from Apple. The program aims to increase the number of customers who purchase iPhones at Apple Stores rather than carrier stores. In 2015, Apple unveiled the iPhone Upgrade Program, a 24-month leasing agreement, which Fortune described as a "change [in] iPhone owners' relationships with mobile carriers".

Repairability 

Only Apple Stores and Apple Authorized Service Providers are allowed by Apple to perform genuine replacements. Apple has taken steps to make third-party repairs more difficult. iPhone components are soldered, and many are glued together. iPhones receive low repairability scores, in part due to the difficulty of obtaining genuine parts, and the difficulty undertaking each repair. This has given rise to the right to repair movement, aimed at giving users cheaper options for repairing their phones. Apple has lobbied against right to repair legistation. Multiple jurisdictions aim to introduce right to repair laws, including the EU, U.K., and U.S.

In the past, Apple bricked iPhone 6 models after their home buttons were replaced, displaying an Error 53 message; Apple called this a bug, and released an update to address the issue. On iPhones with a Touch ID sensor, the home button cannot be replaced by users or independent repair shops without losing Touch ID functionality, since Apple has not made their calibration tool public.

In more recent models, starting with the iPhone XR, Apple displays warnings in the Settings app if the battery, display, or camera are replaced by a third party. Additionally, some features are disabled when a part labelled "non-genuine" is detected, like True Tone, or the battery health measurement. iFixit notes that a proprietary, cloud-linked System Configuration tool is required to "complete" a part repair, meaning that even replacing a genuine part with another genuine part will fail Apple's "genuine parts" check unless said tool is used.

In 2022, Apple rolled out a self-service repair program, allowing any user to buy parts, rent repair tools from Apple, and obtain repair manuals. The program received a degree of praise by iFixit and repair advocates, who also critically noted that Apple maintains control over the parts supply.

Privacy

Tracking prevention 
Apple introduced App Tracking Transparency (ATT) with iOS 14.5 in April 2021. ATT requires apps to ask for explicit permission before being allowed to track the user across other apps and websites. If the user refuses, the app cannot access Apple's Identifier for Advertisers (IDFA), an identifier used to serve personalized ads. ATT does not prevent personalized ads that are based on the user's behavior within the app itself, The feature has been criticised by some as anti-competitive, including Facebook, whose shares fell by 26% after its rollout. Apple exempts their own apps from their anti-tracking measures, which has led to anti-trust investigations by the French and German governments.

Location tracking controversy 
In July 2010, Apple claimed that it collected iPhone users' GPS coordinates and nearby Wi-Fi networks twice a day; a Wall Street Journal investigation found that Android sent this data "several times an hour".

In September 2010, forensic expert Christopher Vance discovered a hidden unencrypted file named "consolidated.db" that contained a record of iPhone users' locations. The file was added with the June 2010 iOS 4 update, though previous versions of iOS stored similar information in a file called "h-cells.plist". On April 20, 2011, The Guardian publicized research by Alasdair Allen and Pete Warden, who found that anyone with physical access to an iPhone could obtain a detailed record of its owner's location and movements over the past year. Moreover, the file was automatically backed up by iTunes onto any computer the iPhone was synchronized with. A Wall Street Journal investigation found that users' locations were still stored when location services are disabled. The controversy led to U.S. congressional scrutiny and an FCC investigation, and was dubbed "Locationgate" by the media.

Apple responded on April 27, 2011, claiming that the data was used to cache nearby Wi-Fi hotspots and cell towers in order to improve location speed and accuracy. The company also claimed that locations being collected when location services were off, and being stored for more than a year, were both bugs. Apple issued an update for iOS (version 4.3.3, or 4.2.8 for the CDMA iPhone 4) which reduced the size of the cache, encrypted it, stopped it being backed up to iTunes, and erased it entirely whenever location services were turned off. Nevertheless, in July 2014, a report on state-owned China Central Television called iPhone tracking a "national security concern."

Currently, iPhones contain a "Frequent Locations" database which records where users have been, along with exact times they arrived and left, raising concerns that the data could be used in court. This feature can be turned off.

Child safety controversy 
In August 2021, Apple announced plans to scan iCloud Photos for child abuse imagery (through an algorithm called "NeuralHash"), and filter explicit images sent and received by children using iPhones (dubbed "Conversation Safety"), to be rolled out later that year. More than 90 policy and human rights groups wrote an open letter to condemn both features. Apple's plan to implement NeuralHash on-device rather than in the cloud led the EFF and security experts to call it a "backdoor" that could later be expanded to detect other types of contents, and would decrease users' privacy. Apple claimed the system was "misunderstood," but announced in December 2022 that the photo scanning feature would never be implemented. The other feature, Conversation Safety, was added in iOS 15.2.

Security 
The iPhone is regarded by security experts as more secure against common malware than Android. Less than 1% of mobile malware targets iOS.

Encryption 
Prior to 2014, the iPhone stored all "messages, pictures and videos, contacts, audio recordings [...] and call history" in unencrypted form, enabling easy access by law enforcement. This changed with iOS 8, which adopted file-based encryption. Apple does not hold the decryption key, and cannot be compelled to turn over user data, even when presented with a government warrant. Companies like Grayshift and Cellebrite developed exploits that enable law enforcement to extract user data from iPhones without needing the user's passcode.

In 2015 and 2016, a dispute unfolded between Apple and the FBI. The FBI had recovered the iPhone 5C of one of the San Bernardino attackers, and iCloud backups of that phone from a month and a half before the shooting. The U.S. government attempted to obtain a court order under the All Writs Act compelling Apple to produce a modified version of iOS that would allow investigators to brute force the device passcode. Tim Cook responded on the company's website, outlining a need for encryption, arguing that a backdoor would compromise the privacy of all iPhone users. The DOJ withdrew its request after the FBI bought an exploit to bypass the iPhone's passcode. As a countermeasure, Apple implemented USB Restricted Mode, which was subsequently exploited too.

Pegasus malware 
In 2016, researchers discovered the Pegasus suite of exploits targeting iOS and Android, which led to significant international media coverage. Some Pegasus exploits are zero-click, meaning that they can fully compromise the device with no user interaction, for example by sending a malformed iMessage to the user that would not even trigger a notification. Pegasus can collect most data, including chats, passwords, and photos, and can turn on the phone's microphone and camera remotely. Apple quickly issued an update fixing FORCEDENTRY and other known Pegasus exploits, though Pegasus continued to be used, relying on new exploits. Apple also sued NSO, the organization behind Pegasus, announced a new security bounty, and added an optional Lockdown Mode to iOS 16 that reduces the iPhone's attack surface.

Prominent victims of Pegasus include Jamal Khashoggi, and numerous activists, businessmen and politicians. Pegasus has been widely used since 2011, and is still used by law enforcement and governments as of July 2022.

Reception and legacy 
The original iPhone has been described as "revolutionary" a "breakthrough handheld computer", and "the best phone that anybody has ever made." It is now Apple's bestselling product, has been credited with helping to make Apple one of the world's most valuable publicly traded companies by 2011. Newer iterations have also received praise and awards.

Before the iPhone, smartphones were mostly used for texting, calls, and email; more advanced functions were harder to use and inconvenient on a small screen. They were also hard to develop for, and lacked a thriving app ecosystem like the App Store (released in 2008). Many phones were heavily customized by mobile carriers, which led to feature fragmentation and prevented these phones from turning into thriving software platforms. In contrast, Apple's iPhone SDK provided a wide range of APIs, made mobile development far more accessible, and was instrumental in turning the iPhone into a "Swiss army knife" with a wide range of features and apps.

Successive iPhone models have generated significant fan enthusiasm, with many customers queuing up in front of Apple Stores on launch day. As of 2021, the iPhone has higher brand loyalty than any other smartphone.

The iPhone's success has led to the decline of incumbents Nokia, BlackBerry, and Motorola. RIM, Symbian and Microsoft all attempted to develop more modern operating systems to compete with the iPhone, like Maemo, Windows Phone, and BlackBerry 10; all were unsuccessful. Google successfully started over on their Android project, and designed it for mass adoption by carriers and phone hardware manufacturers. Today, the iOS and Android account for 99% of smartphones used worldwide.

Sales 

Steve Jobs's initial target was to reach 1% of phone market share in 2008. Apple sold 6.1 million units of the original iPhone between Q3 FY2007 and Q4 FY2008, and 11.3 million units of the iPhone 3G in Q4 FY2008 and Q1 FY2009. In 2008, the iPhone reached 1.1% of worldwide mobile phone market share, and 8.2% of the smartphone market. During this time it was quickly becoming relevant in North America, and in market share was ranked second in the U.S. in 2009, behind the BlackBerry; in 2010 the iPhone 3GS was the best-selling smartphone in the U.S., the first time that an iPhone device reached top spot in that market.

iPhone sales grew continuously year-over-year since its introduction until Q2 FY2016. The iPhone briefly surpassed BlackBerry in Q4 FY2008, and permanently overtook it starting in Q3 FY2010. By 2011, Apple sold 100 million iPhones worldwide, and became the largest mobile phone vendor in the world by revenue, surpassing long-time leader Nokia. Q1 FY2012 marked Apple's best quarterly earnings in its history, with 53% of the company's revenues coming from iPhone sales. Phone sales are strongly seasonal, peaking in the holiday season (Apple's Q1). With the release of the iPhone 13 in Q1 FY2022, Apple temporarily topped Samsung, with 84.9 million units shipped compared to Samsung's 68.9 million. In most quarters, Apple is the second largest smartphone vendor by units.

Today, Samsung and Apple dominate the smartphone market, with 21.8% and 15.6% worldwide market share respectively. Due to Apple's small lineup, Apple often dominates the list of bestselling smartphone models. Despite its lower market share, the iPhone's premium positioning has led it to capture nearly half of global smartphone revenue, and 80% of global smartphone profits, with Samsung taking the other 20%. Carriers compete with each other to subsidize iPhone upgrades, which is seen as a significant factor in iPhone sales, though this has reduced carrier profits. On July 27, 2016, Apple announced that it had sold their 1 billionth iPhone.

Compared to other high-tech products, a greater proportion of iPhone users are female. The iPhone has been adopted by both consumers and business users. iPhone users are wealthier and spend more time on their phones than Android users on average. The iPhone is especially popular in the U.S., where it has a 50% market share, and is used by 87% of teenagers. Worldwide, the iPhone accounts for 78% of the high-end ($1,000+) smartphone market.

Android overtook the iPhone's installed base in 2010, according to NPD Group. During Apple's earnings call on January 27, 2021, Tim Cook said that 1 billion iPhones were being actively used worldwide.

Emerging markets 
While other manufacturers make separate entry-level phones, Apple's entry-level phones are the previous years' models, part of an effort to increase its market share in emerging markets without diluting its premium brand. It also considers emerging market tastes in its product designs; for example, it introduced a gold iPhone after finding that gold was seen as a popular sign of a luxury product among Chinese customers. In 2017, Apple started manufacturing previous years' iPhone models in India; in 2022, it began manufacturing the current iPhone 14 there too. Analysts have speculated that this was partly caused by Apple's desire to reduce its dependence on China, and to overcome Indian import duties.

See also 

 History of the iPhone
 Apple Newton, an early personal digital assistant and the first tablet platform developed by Apple
 Pocket-sized computer

Notes

References

External links 

 
 Evolution of iPhone at TechEngage, February 3, 2021

 
Computer-related introductions in 2007
Digital audio players
ITunes
Mobile phones introduced in 2007